The 1984 Soviet football championship was the 53rd seasons of competitive football in the Soviet Union. Zenit Leningrad won the Top League championship becoming the Soviet domestic champions for the first time.

Honours

Notes = Number in parentheses is the times that club has won that honour. * indicates new record for competition

Soviet Union football championship

Top League

First League

Second League (finals)

 [Oct 21 – Nov 8]

Finals 1

Finals 2

Finals 3

Top goalscorers

Top League
 Sergei Andreyev (SKA Rostov-na-Donu) – 19 goals

First League
Revaz Chelebadze (Dinamo Batumi) – 27 goals

References

External links
 1984 Soviet football championship. RSSSF